Oberhausen Hauptbahnhof is a railway station in Oberhausen, North Rhine-Westphalia, Germany. The station was opened in 1847 and is located on the Duisburg–Dortmund railway, Arnhem-Oberhausen railway, Oberhausen–Duisburg-Ruhrort railway and Oberhausen-Mülheim-Styrum railway and is served by ICE, IC, RE and RB services operated by Deutsche Bahn, Abellio Deutschland, NordWestBahn and Eurobahn.

History
The station was opened in 1847 as part of the trunk line of the former Cologne-Minden Railway Company. The first station building at its present location—a simple half-timbered building and loading facility—was named after the nearby Schloss Oberhausen (palace) and opened on 15 May 1847. It was the first station on the territory of the former Bürgermeisterei of Borbeck; the city of Oberhausen did not exist at this time. The station initially serviced the developing heavy industry, centred on the Gutehoffnungshütte steel works. The entrepreneur Franz Haniel had influence with the Prussian government and the railway company and gained a rail connection to the Lipper heath, now central Oberhausen. After the opening of the station as the company relocated the Altenberg zinc smelter near to the station.

In 1850, the administration of the Zeche Concordia colliery was established in the station building. In 1854, a more elaborate station building was erected. In 1866, the entrance building of the Bergisch-Märkische Railway Company station was built only a few metres away. Other railway companies and new lines were built subsequently.

Until 1880, Oberhausen has become one of the most important railway junctions in the Ruhr area (including Oberhausen West yard, Osterfeld yard was at that time still independent). In the wake of the nationalisation of the Prussian railways in the early 1880s, lines were connected and central stations were established where possible. The Bergisch-Märkische and Cologne-Minden stations were merged in 1888 into a prestigious new station with tunnels connecting the platforms.

Between 1930 and 1934, the current station building was built in the modernist style. Oberhausen architect Schwingel and supervisor of the Deutsche Reichsbahn railway division (Reichsbahndirektion) of Essen, Karl Herrmann, designed the current building in simple cubic forms.

In the Second World War, the station was repeatedly hit by bombs and shells and heavily damaged. The entrance hall building was only restored to operation in 1954 in a heavily modified form, with the Bali-Kino cinema above a false ceiling and a small shopping arcade.

As part of a project called Internationale Bauausstellung Emscher Park ("international building exhibition Emscher Park"), Oberhausen station and its environs were completely renovated and redecorated in 1993. The entrance hall was extensively restored to its original form and the cinema and the shopping arcade were removed. The platform tracks were reduced from 14 to 10. The disused railway mail terminal was demolished and that area along with the former platform of tracks 4 and 5 were converted into the platform of the LVR Industrial Museum Oberhausen. The Die drei Lebensalter (three ages) relief by Ernst Müller Blensdorf was returned to the station. The pedestrian tunnel under the railway tracks was modernised and extended to an entrance on the western side. The headquarters of the Landschaftsverband Rheinland (Rhineland Industrial Museum, LRV), opened in 1997, and the western district thus receive direct access from the station. The reconstruction also included the redesign of the station forecourt with a central bus terminal and the construction of a park and ride car park on the western side.

Train services
The station is served by the following services:

Intercity Express services (ICE 78) Amsterdam - Düsseldorf - Cologne - Frankfurt/Main
Eurocity services (EC 32) Münster - Düsseldorf - Cologne - Koblenz - Mainz - Mannheim - Stuttgart – München – Salzburg – Villach – Klagenfurt
Intercity services (IC 35) Norddeich - Emden - Rheine - Münster - Düsseldorf - Cologne - Koblenz - Mainz - Mannheim - Karlsruhe - Konstanz
Regional services  (Rhein-Emscher-Express) Hamm - Dortmund - Gelsenkirchen - Essen-Altenessen - Oberhausen - Duisburg - Düsseldorf
Regional services  (Rhein-Express) Wesel - Oberhausen - Duisburg - Düsseldorf - Cologne - Bonn - Koblenz
Regional services  (Rhein-IJssel-Express) Arnhem - Emmerich - Wesel - Oberhausen - Duisburg - Düsseldorf
Regional services  (Fossa-Emscher-Express) Moers – Duisburg – Oberhausen - Bottrop
Regional services  (Wupper-Lippe-Express) Wesel – Oberhausen - Mülheim - Essen – Wuppertal
Local services  (Rhein-Emscher-Express) Duisburg – Oberhausen - Essen-Altenessen - Gelsenkirchen – Wanne-Eickel  – Dortmund
Local services  (Emscher-Niederrhein-Bahn) Gelsenkirchen - Essen-Altenessen - Oberhausen - Duisburg - Krefeld - Mönchengladbach
Local services  (Ruhrort-Bahn) Duisburg-Ruhrort - Oberhausen
S-Bahn  Oberhausen - Mülheim - Essen - Hattingen

Bus services
Night Service (only from evening to early morning):
 NE1 (Oberhausen Fröbelplatz - Oberhausen Hirschkamp)
 NE2 (Oberhausen Dümpten - Oberhausen H. Böll Gesamtschule)
 NE3 (Oberhausen Sterkrade - Oberhausen Fröbelplatz)
 NE5 (Oberhausen Sterkrade - Oberhausen Hbf)
 NE6 (Oberhausen Sterkrade - Oberhausen Ruhrpark)
 NE11 (Oberhausen Hbf - Essen Hbf)
 NE12 (Oberhausen OLGA-Park - Mülheim Kaiserplatz)
 NE21 (Oberhausen Hbf - Bottrop ZOB Berliner Platz)

Regular Bus Service:
 122 (Oberhausen Goerdelerstraße - Mülheim Hbf) every 20/30/30 Minutes
 136 (Oberhausen A.-Frank -Realschule - Essen Erbach) every 60 Minutes
 143 (Oberhausen Fröbelplatz - Essen Borbeck Bf) every 20/30/30 Minutes
 185 (Oberhausen City Forum - Essen Borbeck Bf) every 20/30/30 Minutes
 935 (Oberhausen Sterkrade - Oberhausen A.-Frank -Realschule) every 60 Minutes
 939 (Oberhausen Marina/Sea Life - Duisburg Hbf) every 60 Minutes
 955 (Oberhausen H. Böll Gesamtschule - Oberhausen A.-Frank -Realschule) every 60 Minutes
 957 (Oberhausen Sterkrade Bf - Oberhausen Tulpenstraße) every 20/30/30 Minutes
 958 (Oberhausen Sterkrade Bf - Oberhausen Hauptbahnhof) every 20/30/30 Minutes
 960 (Oberhausen Dümpten/OB-Anne-Frank-Realschule - Oberhausen Holten Bf) every 20/30/30 Minutes
 976 (Oberhausen Everslohstraße - Mülheim Heifeskamp) every 20/30/30 Minutes
 995 (Oberhausen A.-Frank -Realschule - Duisburg Marxloh Pollmann) every 60/60/- Minutes

960: On Sundays or evening Monday to Saturday the line is split from Marktstraße changing the destination to Dümpten or Anne-Frank-Realschule

Tram Services

 112 (Oberhausen Neumarkt - Oberhausen-Sterkrade Station - Oberhausen Hbf - Mülheim) every 10 Minutes

Gallery

References

External links 
 
  
 
 
 
STOAG Website 

Railway stations in North Rhine-Westphalia
Buildings and structures in Oberhausen
S2 (Rhine-Ruhr S-Bahn)
S3 (Rhine-Ruhr S-Bahn)
Rhine-Ruhr S-Bahn stations
Railway stations in Germany opened in 1847
1847 establishments in Prussia